Brent Antonello (born August 25, 1989) is an American actor, best known for his roles of Jude Kinkade in VH1's Hit the Floor and Detective Jamie Whelan on NBC's Law & Order: Organized Crime.

Career
Antonello began playing sports agent Jude Kinkade on Hit the Floor in 2014.

In 2018, Antonello appeared as Hank Sullivan on The CW's Dynasty reboot.

In 2022, Antonello joined the cast of NBC's Law & Order: Organized Crime in the role of Detective Jamie Whelan.

Filmography

References

External links
 

1989 births
Living people
American male television actors